Young & Restless is the second album by American singer Kristinia DeBarge that was released on May 3, 2013 through Manhattan Records exclusively to Japan. Two singles have been released so far. "Cry Wolf", the first single was released on September 27, 2012 independently and did not chart on any major chart. "Ignite", its second single was released on April 3, 2013 exclusively through Japan iTunes and has so far peaked at number six on the iTunes Japan R&B chart.

Track listing

Release history

References

Kristinia DeBarge albums
2013 albums
Manhattan Records albums